Serravalle is a municipality in the district of Blenio in the canton of Ticino in Switzerland.  It was formed on 1 April 2012 by the merger of the former municipalities of Malvaglia, Semione and Ludiano.

History

Ludiano
In 1926 a grave was discovered which contained Iron Age grave offerings. The modern municipality of Ludiano is first mentioned in 1211 as Luguilano. It was mentioned as a local center for surrounding farmhouses and villages in 1351.

The parish church of S. Secondo is first mentioned in 1293. It was rebuilt in 1779–82, though the older romanesque clock tower was retained.

In the past, the main sources of income were crops, livestock and vineyards. This income was supplemented by money sent back to the village by emigrants to other European countries. After the emigration-related decline in the mid-19th century, the number of inhabitants has increased in the last decades of the 20th century and has led to numerous new homes. In 2000 about half the jobs in the village were in manufacturing and the services sector accounted for about a fifth of the jobs. Two-thirds of the working population earned their livelihood outside the community.

Malvaglia
Malvaglia is first mentioned in 1205 as de Malvallia.  In German it used to be known as Manglia. Malvaglia's development and history is closely tied to the development and history of the Blenio valley.  In the settlement of Rongier, an ancient town on the Lukmanier road, a Roman coin hoard was found.  The settlement is also home to the Casa Baggio.  Casa Baggio was built in the 16th century and expanded in the 17th.  It was probably the ruling seat of the bailiff.  The building is now listed as a historic building.  Above the village is also the remains of Casa dei pagani, a cave castle from the 11th–13th Centuries.

The original, parish church was dedicated to St. Benedict and first mentioned in 1207.  The current building, with St. Martin as the patron saint is from 1602 to 1603, but the bell tower is from the 13th Century.

The local economy was dominated by agriculture, animal husbandry, vineyards.  The emigration in until the 19th century to Italy and in the 19th and 20th centuries to France, England, and America, led to a sharp population decline.  Between 1933 and 1959, the first cable car in the Canton was in operation between Malvaglia and Ponterio in the Malvaglia Valley.  In 1995 a new line was inaugurated on Mount Dagro.  In the 1940s for the construction of the dam, a road was built into the Malvaglia Valley.  The ring road around the village open in 1976.  In 2000 about one-third and one-half of the workers were employed in manufacturing and the services sectors, respectively.  More than half of employed persons worked outside of the municipality.

Geography
Of this area, about 12.4% is used for agricultural purposes, while 47.2% is forested. Of the rest of the land, 1.8% is settled (buildings or roads) and 38.6% is unproductive land. Of the agricultural land,  is used for orchards and vineyards,  is fields and grasslands and  consists of alpine grazing areas. Rivers and lakes cover  in the municipality.

Demographics
, 8.4% of the population are resident foreign nationals. Over the last 5 years (2010–2015) the population has changed at a rate of 4.17%. The birth rate in the municipality, in 2015, was 6.3, while the death rate was 10.6 per thousand residents.

, children and teenagers (0–19 years old) make up 20.1% of the population, while adults (20–64 years old) are 55.9% of the population and seniors (over 64 years old) make up 24.0%. The population of Serravalle is older than the national average.  In 2015 there were 499 residents who were over 65 years old (24% vs 18% nationally) and out of those 176 who were over 80 (8.5% vs 5% nationally). In 2015 there were 890 single residents, 894 people who were married or in a civil partnership, 130 widows or widowers and 161 divorced residents.

In 2015 there were 897 private households in Serravalle with an average household size of 2.27 persons. In 2015 about 85.9% of all buildings in the municipality were single family homes, which is much greater than the percentage in the canton (68.1%) and much greater than the percentage nationally (57.4%). In 2014 the rate of construction of new housing units per 1000 residents was 2.89.  The vacancy rate for the municipality, was 0.54%.

Historic Population
The historical population is given in the following chart:

Heritage sites of national significance
The Casa dei pagani (a cave castle) and the parish church of S. Martino with its ossuary and churchyard in Malvaglia and the Parish Church of S. Maria Assunta with Ossuary, the Oratory of S. Maria Bambina a Navone and the ruins of Serravalle Castle in Semione are listed as Swiss heritage site of national significance. The villages of Rongie/Orino, Semione, Navone and the Val Malvaglia region are all listed on the Inventory of Swiss Heritage Sites.

Economy
Serravalle is classed as an industrial-tertiary municipality, a municipality where agriculture and manufacturing play a minor role in the economy.

, there were a total of 554 people employed in the municipality.  Of these, a total of 118 people worked in 49 businesses in the primary economic sector.  The secondary sector employed 267 workers in 34 separate businesses, of which there were 6 small businesses with a total of 123 employees and one mid sized business with a total of 89 employees.  Finally, the tertiary sector provided 169 jobs in 84 businesses.

In 2015 a total of 2.9% of the population received social assistance.

In 2015 the average cantonal, municipal and church tax rate in the municipality for a couple with two children making  was 2.4% while the rate for a single person making  was 16.1%, both of which are close to the average for the canton. The canton has one of the lowest average tax rates for those making  and an average rate for those making .

Politics
In the 2015 federal election the most popular party was the Ticino League with 23.5% of the vote.  The next three most popular parties were the FDP (21.9%), the CVP (21.2%) and the SP (14.1%).  In the federal election, a total of 975 votes were cast, and the voter turnout was 53.7%.

References

Cultural property of national significance in Ticino
Municipalities of Ticino